Uranchimegiin Mönkh-Erdene (born March 22, 1982) is an amateur boxer from Mongolia who competed in the Lightweight (−60 kg) and junior welterweight (-64 kg) divisions at three Olympics, in 2004, 2008 and won a bronze medal at the 2012.

In 2017, Mönkh-Erdene won a Silver medal in the Eindhoven Box Cup in the Netherlands. In the quarterfinals, he won a points decision over Joe Kelly of Ireland, and in the semi-finals, won a split decision over 3-time Netherlands champion Aito Koster. In the finals, Mönkh Erdene lost by a unanimous decision against Sammy Wagensveld, also from the Netherlands.

Career
 East Asian Game Gold medal 2001
 World Cup Silver medal 2008
 World Championships’ double medal (2009, 2013)
 Asian Championship Gold medal 2011
 Olympic Games bronze medal 2012.
 Eindhoven Box Cup Silver medal 2017.

External links
 
 2nd Qualifier
 

1982 births
Living people
People from Övörkhangai Province
Mongolian male boxers
Lightweight boxers
Light-welterweight boxers
Olympic boxers of Mongolia
Olympic bronze medalists for Mongolia
Olympic medalists in boxing
Boxers at the 2004 Summer Olympics
Boxers at the 2008 Summer Olympics
Boxers at the 2012 Summer Olympics
Medalists at the 2012 Summer Olympics
Asian Games medalists in boxing
Asian Games silver medalists for Mongolia
Boxers at the 2002 Asian Games
Boxers at the 2006 Asian Games
Medalists at the 2006 Asian Games
AIBA World Boxing Championships medalists
20th-century Mongolian people
21st-century Mongolian people